The Central Texas Stampede are a defunct minor league professional ice hockey team which was located in Belton, Texas. They played in the Western Professional Hockey League for five seasons, from 1996 to 2001. The team folded during the fifth season of its operation. The team played its home games at the Bell County Expo Center.

History
The Central Texas Stampede were one of the "original six" teams of the now defunct Western Professional Hockey League. On October 15, 1996 the Stampede defeated the Waco Wizards 5-4 in the first ever WPHL contest.

The Stampede had four head coaches during its five year run in the WPHL. The team's first coach was former NHL player Bob Bourne, who led the team to a 35-27-2 record for 72 points in the 1996-97 season. For the 1997-98 season the team was coached by former NHLer Lee Norwood, who led the team to a 40-23-6 record for 86 points. The 1998-99 season was coached by Glen Williamson (who was previously an NHL assistant coach with the Winnipeg Jets. He coached the team to season record of 33-24-12 for 78 points.

The team's final two seasons were coached by Todd Lalonde. Although Lalonde has no NHL experience, in his first year as head coach he was able to lead the team to their best ever record of 50-17-3. Their 103 points put the team at the top the league's standings at the end of the 1999-2000 regular season.

Despite the relative success of the team, the location of the Expo center and a small population base caused the team to struggle throughout their history to maintain a solid attendance figure. On one night during the last season, the paid attendance was less than 900 with less than 300 people in actual attendance. The management struggled and fell far behind on paying their expenses. On January 6, 2001, the Central Texas Stampede played its last game. The team had played only 38 games before folding midway through the 2000-01 season.

The WPHL merged with the Central Hockey League after the 2000-01 season and its surviving teams continued playing in the Central Hockey League until 2013 when a group of team owners bought the league itself.

Post-WPHL history
The market was subsequently home to:
 Central Texas Blackhawks (2002–2003) AWHL
 Central Texas Blackhawks (2003–2004) NAHL
 Central Texas Marshals (2004–2005) NAHL

References

External links
Team History at HockeyDB.com

Defunct ice hockey teams in Texas
Ice hockey teams in Texas